Ibrahima Diallo (born 26 September 1985) is a footballer from Guinea who plays as a left back.

Early career
Raised in France, Diallo began his football career playing for CSF Bretigny.

Professional career
Diallo signed French Ligue 2 club EA Guingamp in 2005 and after signed for R. Charleroi S.C.
In 2010, Diallo moved in K.V. Oostende before moving to Waasland-Beveren in 2011.
On 27 June 2012, Diallo signed for French Ligue 2 side Angers on a two-year contract.

International career
Diallo celebrated his first cap for Guinea national football team against Tunisia for a friendly game.

External links
 
 
 
 fifa.com

1985 births
Living people
Guinean footballers
Guinean expatriate footballers
FC Rouen players
En Avant Guingamp players
R. Charleroi S.C. players
K.V. Oostende players
Angers SCO players
Association football defenders
Belgian Pro League players
Expatriate footballers in Belgium
2012 Africa Cup of Nations players
S.K. Beveren players
Guinea international footballers